WCHL may refer to:

 Western Canada Hockey League (1921–26)
 Western Canada Hockey League (1932–33) (minor pro)
 Worcester Collegiate Hockey League (1966–72) (second-tier NCAA)
 Western Hockey League (1968–78), also known as the Western Canada Hockey League
 West Coast Hockey League (1995–2003)
 Western Collegiate Hockey League (2013–)
 WCHL (AM), a radio station licensed to Chapel Hill, North Carolina, United States